"Fade" is a song by  Scottish singer-songwriter Lewis Capaldi. It was released as a digital download on 9 October 2017 via Virgin Records as the third single from his debut extended play Bloom and his debut studio album Divinely Uninspired to a Hellish Extent. The song peaked at number 33 on the Scottish Singles Chart.

Track listing

Charts

Certifications

Release history

References

2017 songs
2017 singles
Lewis Capaldi songs
Songs written by Malay (record producer)
Songs written by Lewis Capaldi
Virgin Records singles